Mount Perseverance is the high peak near the south end of the ridge from Mount Whitcombe, overlooking the lower Benson Glacier in Victoria Land. So named because it was the final station occupied by the New Zealand Northern Survey Party of the Commonwealth Trans-Antarctic Expedition (1956–58) during a particularly long day's field work on October 22, 1957.

Mountains of Victoria Land
Scott Coast